KBCE (102.3 FM, ″102.3 Jack-FM") is an American radio station broadcasting an Adult Hits format. Licensed to Boyce, Louisiana, United States, the station serves the Alexandria, Louisiana area.  The station is currently owned by JWBP Broadcasting.  Its studios are located at FCA Plaza in Alexandria, and its transmitter is located near Boyce.

History 

The station was assigned the call letters KXOU on June 17, 1981.  On November 23, the station changed its call sign to KFQM and then changed again on April 5, 1982, to the current KBCE along with a change to an Urban Contemporary format. KBCE recently changed to an Adult Hits format as "102.3 Jack-FM"

References

External links 

 

Radio stations in Louisiana
Adult hits radio stations in the United States
Mass media in Alexandria, Louisiana